The Battle of Sideling Hill was an engagement between Pennsylvania colonial militia and a band of Native Americans that had recently attacked Fort McCord and taken a number of colonial settlers captive.  On April 1, 1756, a band of Delawares, probably under the command of either Captain Jacobs or Shingas, stormed Fort McCord in western Pennsylvania, where they captured or killed 27 settlers.  In response to the raid, three bands of militia were sent in pursuit.  Captain Alexander Culbertson's company, numbering about 50, caught up with the Delawares three days later.  In a two-hour engagement, both sides suffered heavy casualties, but the colonists were driven off by the arrival of reinforcements. Captain Culbertson was killed and his unit suffered 80 percent casualties.

The precise location of the Battle of Sideling Hill, and hence the burial site of the militia lost in the battle, has not been determined. It is postulated that the Battle of Sideling Hill took place near Maddensville at the confluence of Little Aughwick Creek and Sideling Hill Creek at a place now known as Anderson's Grove.

External links
 The history and topography of Dauphin, Cumberland, Franklin, Bedford, Adams, and Perry counties (Pennsylvania)

Sideling Hill
Sideling Hill
Pre-statehood history of Pennsylvania
Sideling Hill
Sideling Hill
Sideling Hill
1756 in Pennsylvania